The Wolek family are fictional characters from the American soap opera One Life to Live present at its debut in 1968. The Woleks were created as a working-class reflection of the affluent Lord family, and storylines focused on the shared relations of the two families.

The Polish American family is formed around the relationships of Dr. Lawrence "Larry" Wolek, a leading protagonist character that appears from the debut episode July 15, 1968 through May 28, 2004.

Generations

First generation
 Anna Wolek (Doris Belack, Kathleen Maguire, Phyllis Behar)  Original character. Born off-screen early 1940s as of 1968. Sister of Vince and Larry, distant cousin of Karen and Jenny.
 Vincent "Vinny" Wolek (Antony Ponzini, Jordan Charney, Michael Ingram)  Original character. Born off-screen mid-1940s; dies onscreen July 9, 1981. Brother to Anna and Larry, distant cousin of Karen and Jenny.
 Lawrence "Larry" Wolek (Paul Tulley, Jim Storm, Michael Storm)  Original character. Born off-screen late 1940s. Brother of Anna and Vince, distant cousin of Jenny and Karen.
 Karen Wolek (Kathryn Breech, Julia Duffy, Judith Light)  Born off-screen early 1950s. Sister of Jenny, distant cousin of Anna, Vince and Larry.
 Jennifer "Jenny" Wolek (Katherine Glass, Brynn Thayer)  Born off-screen mid-to-late 1950s; dies off-screen 1997. Sister of Karen, distant cousin of Anna, Vince and Larry.

Second generation
 Cathy Craig (Catherine Burns, Amy Levitt, Jane Alice Brandon, Dorrie Kavanaugh, Jennifer Harmon)  Born off-screen 1951 to Jim Craig and unnamed mother, adopted by Anna Wolek Craig.
 Daniel Wolek (Timothy Waldrip, Steven Culp, Ted Demers, Joshua Cox, Michael Palance, and child actors)  Born onscreen November 17, 1971, to Larry Wolek and Meredith Lord Wolek; birth year changed to 1966 as of 1983.

Third generation
 Megan Craig Riley (child actors)  Born onscreen December 2, 1974, to Cathy Craig and Joe Riley; dies onscreen October 3, 1975.

Introduction

When the Wolek family is first introduced at the inception of One Life to Live, Dr. Larry Wolek is presented as the youngest of an upwardly mobile clan of siblings who live in a rough-and-tumble west Llanview apartment building directly opposite Llanfair housekeeper Sadie Gray (Lillian Hayman). Larry's siblings are shown to be elders Anna Wolek, sibling matriarch and Llanview Hospital volunteer, and Vince Wolek, an auto mechanic. The mother and father of the three original Woleks are deceased at the show's inception, and the two older siblings personally and financially sacrifice to enable Larry to pursue his expensive dream of being a doctor. Anna sacrifices for her brother's medical career selflessly, but their brother Vince is shown as being particularly resentful of the prestige and opportunity a medical career affords resident physician Larry and the studying doctor's romantic relationship with Meredith Lord, the daughter of Llanview media mogul Victor Lord.

After Meredith's death, Wolek distant cousins and siblings Jenny and Karen Wolek arrive in fictional Llanview the mid-1970s. Larry and Karen marry after a whirlwind courtship and romance, but she later cuckolds him when she becomes a prostitute and the two divorce. Jenny engages in a series of romances from the late 1970s through the 1980s.

Family tree

|-
|
|-
|

|-
|style="text-align: left;"|Notes:

Descendants

|-
|style="text-align: left;"|
 Unknown Wolek (distant relative; deceased)
  Unknown Wolek (deceased)
   c. Anna Wolek
    m. Jim Craig [1969-1981; dissolved]
     ac. Cathy Craig (biological child of Jim and his deceased first wife)
   c. Vince Wolek [deceased 1981]
    m. Wanda Webb [1975-1981; dissolved]
   c. Larry Wolek
    m. Karen Martin [1969; divorced]
    m. Meredith Lord [1970-1973; dissolved] (deceased)
     c. Daniel Wolek [b. 1971]
     c. Unnamed daughter [stillborn 1971]
    m. Karen Wolek [1977-1979; divorced]
    m. Laurel Chapin [1985-1986; dissolved] (deceased)
  Unknown Wolek (deceased)
   c. Jenny Wolek [deceased 1997]
    m. Tim Siegel [dissolved 1976]
    m. Brad Vernon [1978-1981; divorced]
     c. Mary Vernon [stillborn 1979]
    m. Peter Janssen [1981-1982; dissolved] (deceased)
    m. David Renaldi [1984-199?; dissolved] (deceased)
   c. Karen Wolek
    m. Larry Wolek [1977-1979; divorced]
|-
|style="text-align: left;"|Notes
|-
|style="text-align: left;"|

References

External links
 Wolek family tree – SoapCentral.com

One Life to Live families
Television characters introduced in 1968
Fictional Polish-American people